Durio ceylanicus, the Ceylon durian, is a species of flowering plant in the family Malvaceae. It is found only in Sri Lanka. The Ceylon durian, a large prickly fruit, is inedible and does not stink.

Culture

References

ceylanicus
Endemic flora of Sri Lanka
Vulnerable plants
Taxonomy articles created by Polbot
Taxobox binomials not recognized by IUCN